Roentgen is the debut album by Hyde, released on March 27, 2002. It was released on his own label Haunted Records, a division of Sony's Ki/oon Records. The cover of the regular edition is an X-ray of Hyde's own skull. "The Cape of Storms" was used as the theme song for the movie Kagen no Tsuki, which Hyde starred in.

An English version was released overseas on July 4. A Japanese release of the English version, titled Roentgen English, was released on October 14, 2004. That version came with three bonus songs that were originally used as B-side's on Hyde's singles. The limited edition of the Japanese release came with a DVD that included the music video for "The Cape of Storms" and the audio only track; "The Cape of Storms -Last Quarter Mix-".

The album ranked fifth on the Oricon chart.

Track listing 
All songs written and composed by Hyde.
 "Unexpected"
 "White Song"
 "Evergreen"
 "Oasis"
 "A Drop of Colour"
 "Shallow Sleep"
 "New Day's Dawn"
 "Angel's Tale"
 "The Cape of Storms"
 "Secret Letters"

International version bonus tracks
 "Evergreen (English Ensemble)"
 "Angel's Tale (English Ensemble)"
 "Shallow Sleep (English Ensemble)"

References

Hyde (musician) albums
2002 debut albums